Frederick E. B. Harvey (traditional Chinese: 夏福禮, simplified Chinese: 夏福礼), was a British diplomat who served as H.M.'s Consul in China during the mid-19th century.

Career

References

British diplomats
19th-century English people
Year of birth missing
Year of death missing